Odifreddi may refer to:

 108072 Odifreddi, a minor planet discovered on 22 March 2001 in the Cima Ekar station
 Piergiorgio Odifreddi (born 1950), Italian mathematician and logician